Nagoya University of Commerce & Business (Nagoya shōka daigaku), also called NUCB Undergraduate School, is a non-profit Japanese private university in Nisshin, Aichi, in the Tokai region of Japan.

History

The school was established by Yuichi Kurimoto in 1953. In 1968 it moved to Nisshin, in the Tokai region. In 2001, a second campus was opened in downtown Nagoya.

The Kurimoto Japanese Garden of the University of Alberta in Canada is named after Kurimoto.

Accreditation
The school has been accredited by the Association to Advance Collegiate Schools of Business since 2006. The NUCB Business School is the only school in Japan to be triple-accredited.

It is also accredited by the Japan University Accreditation Association.

Notes and references

External links
 

Educational institutions established in 1935
Private universities and colleges in Japan
Nagoya University of Commerce & Business
1935 establishments in Japan
Nisshin, Aichi